The 2010 F2000 Championship Series season marked the fifth season of competition in the series. It comprised 14 rounds (seven double-race weekends), beginning April 10 at Virginia International Raceway and concluding September 5 at Mid-Ohio Sports Car Course.

With six victories during the season, Victor Carbone finished it as the champion, 74 points clear of closest rival Cole Morgan, who took two wins. Daniel Erickson finished the season in third place, despite missing two early-season rounds at Road Atlanta and Mosport, taking a double win at Watkins Glen and Mid-Ohio. Jonathan Scarallo, Chris Livengood and Remy Audette took the other race wins as they all finished inside the top ten in the championship standings.

Drivers and teams
The series released a 33-car entry list on March 29, 2010.

Race calendar and results

Final standings

Full Results
This list only contains drivers who registered for the championship.

References

External links
 Official Series Website

F2000 Championship Series seasons
F2000